The Battle of San Pablo del Monte took place on May 5, 1863 during the Siege of Puebla (1863).

See also
List of battles of the French intervention in Mexico

References

1863 in Mexico
Battles involving France
Battles involving Mexico
Battles of the Second French intervention in Mexico
Conflicts in 1863
May 1863 events